Zelotes fratris is a species of ground spider in the family Gnaphosidae. It is found in Russia (Siberia) and North America.

References

Gnaphosidae
Articles created by Qbugbot
Spiders described in 1920